The 2009 ARAG World Team Cup was a tennis tournament play on outdoor clay courts. It was the 31st edition of the World Team Cup and was part of the 250 series of the 2009 ATP World Tour. It took place at the Rochusclub in Düsseldorf, Germany, from 17 May through 23 May 2009.

Sweden was the defending champions, but they failed to advance beyond the group stage. Serbia defeated Germany in the final, by two rubbers to one for their first title.

Squads

Blue group

Juan Martín del Potro (# 5)
Máximo González (# 77)
Juan Mónaco (# 52)

Simone Bolelli (# 59)
Francesco Piccari (# 406)
Andreas Seppi (# 54)

Igor Andreev (# 27)
Evgeny Korolev (# 102)
Dmitry Tursunov (# 23)
Stanislav Vovk (# 1137)

Janko Tipsarević (# 72)
Viktor Troicki (# 37)
Nenad Zimonjić (# 1 Doubles)

Red group

Jérémy Chardy  (# 39)
Gilles Simon (# 15)
Jo-Wilfried Tsonga (# 10)

Nicolas Kiefer   (# 113)
Philipp Kohlschreiber (# 27)
Rainer Schüttler (# 29)
Mischa Zverev  (# 53)

Robert Lindstedt (# 16 Doubles)
Robin Söderling (# 9)
Andreas Vinciguerra (# 657)

Mardy Fish (# 57)
Robby Ginepri (# 102)
Sam Querrey (# 25)

Round robin

Blue group

Standings

Russia vs. Italy

Argentina vs. Serbia

Russia vs. Serbia

Argentina vs. Italy

Argentina vs. Russia

Serbia vs. Italy

Red group

Standings

Germany vs. USA

France vs. Sweden

Germany vs. France

USA vs. Sweden

France vs. USA

Sweden vs. Germany

Final

Serbia vs. Germany

References

External links
Official site
Teams squads

ARAG ATP World Team Championship
Arag World Team Cup, 2009
World Team Cup